Gerry Gray may refer:

 Gerry Gray (soccer), former Canadian soccer player
 Gerry Gray (ice hockey), former Canadian ice hockey player

See also
 Jerry Gray
 Jerry Gray (arranger)